Heiligenhafen (Holsatian: Hilligenhaven) is a town in the district of Ostholstein, in Schleswig-Holstein, Germany. It is situated on the Baltic Sea coast, opposite the island Fehmarn, approx. 60 km northeast of Lübeck, and 55 km east of Kiel.

Geography
The town centre is located on a small bight, the binnensee (inland lake) from which the west of the town has been separated. Two headlands are located off the coast: Steinwarder and Graswarder, the latter one is a bird sanctuary.

Economy
A little fishing port and a marina with about 1000 moorings is located at the open part of the bight close to the town centre. Tourism is an important part of the economy of the town. 
Every summer the main attraction is a 10-day festival called 'Hafenfest Tage' (harbour festival) which attracts visitors from all over the country.
The town just celebrated its 250-year anniversary and has kept the charm of the traditional German fishing town though some well designed amendments to the town centre have been made.

Born in Heiligenhafen

 Eugen Petersen (1836-1919), archaeologist
 Wilhelm Jensen (1837-1911), lyricist and writer

Connected to Heiligenhafen

 Theodor Storm (1817-1888) jurist and famous writer, was inspired by a stay in Heiligenhafen in 1881 to the novella Hans and Heinz Kirch, whose scene is located here.
 Fritz Graßhoff (1913-1997), draftsman, painter and writer, was interned here after the war and wrote in 1945 the Heiligenhafen Sternsingerspiel (carol singer play)

Port cities and towns of the Baltic Sea
Port cities and towns in Germany
Populated coastal places in Germany (Baltic Sea)
Ostholstein